Neoclytus cordifer, the mangrove borer, is a species of long-horned beetle in the family Cerambycidae.

References

Further reading

 
 

Neoclytus
Articles created by Qbugbot
Beetles described in 1829